Juan Cirerol (born 8 June 1987) is a Mexican singer-songwriter.

Cirerol was born in Mexicali, Mexico.  He studied classical guitar since he was 13 at the Autonomous University of Baja California.

He started off early in several punk bands. Having spent his youth writing, Cirerol has at this point composed over 200 songs.

In 2008, he started playing in the north of Mexico (Hermosillo, Tijuana, Mexicali) and recorded his debut studio album, No mas sirvo pa' cantar.

In 2008, he recorded and released his second studio album, Ofrenda al Mictlan, while in Mexico City with the help of visual artist Txema Novelo, under the independent record label Vale Vergas Discos.

His song "Corrido Chicalor" was named in September 2011 by guardian.co.uk and the Music Alliance Pact, as one of the 35 best new tracks in the world.

This album, Ofrenda al Mictlan was very well received and the music critics at Club Fonograma rated it as the 11th best album of 2011.

Carlos Reyes has called Cirerol "a storyteller, a romantic, and a stylist of the popular song".

Discography

Albums

References

External links

1986 births
Living people
People from Mexicali
Mexican male singer-songwriters
Mexican singer-songwriters
21st-century Mexican singers
21st-century Mexican male singers